Vadstena Castle is a former Royal Castle in Vadstena, the province of Östergötland, Sweden.

History
Vadstena Castle was originally built by King Gustav I in 1545 as a fortress to protect Stockholm from enemies approaching from the south. The fortress consisted of three smaller stone buildings facing Lake Vättern, three 31-meter wide ramparts, a courtyard, a moat and four circular cannon turrets. The original ramparts were torn down in the 19th century and the present ramparts were inaugurated in 1999. The stone buildings later formed the ground floor of the castle.

On August 22, 1552, King Gustav I married his third wife, Catherine Stenbock, in Vadstena. One of the castle banqueting halls is called The Wedding Hall, although its construction wasn't finished in time for the wedding.

The reconstruction from fortress into a habitable castle began in the 1550s, when prince Magnus became Duke of Östergötland. Duke Magnus suffered from mental illness and was the only son of Gustav I who didn't eventually become king of Sweden. Magnus died in 1595 and is buried in the church of nearby Vadstena Abbey.

By 1620, when the castle was completed,  all the kings of the House of Vasa had contributed to its construction. Since 1620, the castle has been very well preserved, and is one of Sweden's best examples of Renaissance architecture.
  
Vadstena Castle was a royal palace until 1716, when the royal family lost interest in it; after which it became a storage barn for grain.

Today
Since 1899, the castle has housed the Provincial Archives and today visitors can also find a Castle Museum with 16th and 17th century furniture, portraits and paintings. The castle is also the seat of the International Vadstena Academy, Sweden's smallest opera house, commissioning new operas and reviving lost operas from archival scores. During summers the courtyard plays host to many concerts; both classical and pop music.

External links 

Official visitor site (Swedish)
The castle at the Nationalmuseum website

Notes

Listed buildings in Sweden
Östergötland
Castles in Östergötland County
Museums in Östergötland County
Historic house museums in Sweden
Royal residences in Sweden